Esta Livio is a Pakistani Alternative rock band from Lahore, Punjab. The band's name literally means "It's alive".

About the band 
The band was created by lead singer Hasan Shahid in 2006 in the UK while bass guitarist Hamza Maqsood, lead guitarist Rehan Akhtar and rhythm guitarist Sheraz Arif joined the band when Hasan moved to Pakistan in 2009. 
Since its inception, the band has been recording original music and has performed all over Lahore and on a number of notable radio channels including BBC Radio, Radio1 FM91 and Radio Pakistan in the country while they have appeared on radio channels in the US and Middle East. The band has also appeared numerous times on TV channels including PTV World, Dunya TV and A-Plus Entertainment.

Music 
The band's first single 'Aakheya See' was launched with a video in March 2014 and received heavy radio play while being broadcast on heavy rotation on major television channels in Pakistan. 
Other music from the band that has gained popularity due to live performances includes original tracks like Jogiya, Poocho, Wekh Tamasha, Akhiyaan and Kya Chahtey Ho while the band is also known for performing unique covers of mainstream artists like Lady Gaga and Britney Spears.

Notable works 
The band created the background score and voice over for a TV ad for international shoe brand Deluxe Shoes. 
They were chosen as brand ambassadors for local NGO Pace2Life in 2013.
Lyrics for 4 of the band's original songs were published in leading literary Punjabi magazine 'Swer' in Pakistan.

Notable live performances 
Multiple performances at various branches of Beaconhouse School System in Lahore where they opened for artists such as Uzair Jaswal, Meesha Shafi, Entity Paradigm and Qurat-ul-Ain Balouch.
Performance at 'December Fusion' with Nescafé Basement alumni Rizwan Butt and popular rapper Billy X. 
A 3-hour headlining concert at Bloomfield Hall School, DGK. 
International Music Festival at Ali Auditorium, Lahore.
A special guest performance at Ciro’s Pomodoro in Lahore.
University of Engineering and Technology, Lahore Music Fest.
Special performance’s at Mall of Lahore (Winter Fest) and Sadiq Trade Center, Lahore.

See also 
 List of Pakistani music bands

References

Musical groups from Lahore
Pakistani rock music groups